The first world record in the women's 800 metres freestyle in long course (50 metres) swimming was recognised by the International Swimming Federation (FINA) in 1931. The women's 880 yard freestyle had been a FINA-recognised world record event since 1919. However, in 1931 FINA decreed that only performances from 1931 onward would be eligible for world record consideration in the 800 metres freestyle. Thus Helene Madison's 1930 world record of 11:41.2 in the 880 yard freestyle was not considered a world record in the 800 metres freestyle even though it was over a longer distance and substantially faster than Yvonne Godard's 1931 world record of 12:18.8 in the 800 metres freestyle. In 1933, Lenore Kight swam the 880 yard freestyle in 11:44.0, which FINA recognised as a world record in the 800 metres freestyle but not in the 880 yard freestyle. This irregularity was finally resolved in 1935, when Kight's 11:34.4 in the 880 yard freestyle broke the records for both the 880 yard freestyle and the 800 metres freestyle. Because of this situation, the world records for the 880 yard freestyle for women from 1919 to 1930 are included below.

Men

Long course
.

Short course

Women

Long course

Short course

All-time top 25

Men long course
Correct as of August 2022

Notes
Below is a list of other times equal or superior to 7:45.11:
Sun Yang also swam 7:39.96 (2015), 7:41.36 (2013), 7:44.12 (2011), 7:45.01 (2019).
Gregorio Paltrinieri also swam 7:40.22 (2020), 7:40.81 (2015), 7:40.86 (2022), 7:41.19 (2022), 7:41.96 (2021), 7:42.11 (2021), 7:42.33 (2016), 7:42.44 (2017), 7:43.01 (2014), 7:43.62 (2021), 7:44.19 (2022), 7:44.97 (2016), 7:44.98 (2014).
Grant Hackett also swam 7:40.34 (2001), 7:43.16 (2005), 7:43.82 (2003), 7:44.47 (2001), 7:44.57 (2001), 7:44.78 (2002), 7:44.91 (2003).
Mykhailo Romanchuk also swam 7:41.28 (2021), 7:42.33 (2021), 7:42.49 (2019), 7:42.61 (2021), 7:42.96 (2018), 7:43.90 (2020), 7:44.75 (2022), 7:45.02 (2022), 7:45.03 (2022).
Ian Thorpe also swam 7:41.59 (2001).
Gabriele Detti also swam 7:41.64 (2017), 7:42.74 (2014), 7:43.06 (2016), 7:43.52 (2016), 7:43.83 (2019), 7:43.89 (2019).
Florian Wellbrock also swam 7:41.77 (2021), 7:42.68 (2021), 7:43.03 (2019), 7:43.10 (2022), 7:44.80 (2022).
Oussama Mellouli also swam 7:41.82 (2009).
Robert Finke also swam 7:41.87 (2021), 7:42.72 (2021), 7:43.32 (2022).
Ryan Cochrane also swam 7:41.92 (2009), 7:43.61 (2009, 2013), 7:43.70 (2013).
Jack McLoughlin also swam 7:42.64 (2019), 7:45.00 (2021).
Lukas Märtens also swam 7:42.65 (2022).
Henrik Christiansen also swam 7:44.21 (2017), 7:45.11 (2019).
Federico Colbertaldo also swam 7:44.29 (2009).
Connor Jaeger also swam 7:44.51 (2015), 7:44.77 (2015).
Zane Grothe also swam 7:44.57 (2018).

Men short course
Correct as of December 2022

Notes
Below is a list of other times equal or superior to 7:35.23:
Grant Hackett also swam 7:25.28 (2008).
Henrik Christiansen also swam 7:29.39 (2019), 7:30.79 (2019), 7:31.48 (2022), 7:33.28 (2019).
Gregorio Paltrinieri also swam 7:29.99 (2022), 7:31.33 (2015), 7:34.63 (2014).
Mykhailo Romanchuk also swam 7:31.92 (2018), 7:33.40† (2021).
Florian Wellbrock also swam 7:32.85† (2021).
David Johnston also swam 7:34.33 (2022).
Anton Ipsen also swam 7:34.73 (2020).

Women long course
Correct as of August 2022

Notes
Below is a list of other times equal or superior to 8:19.43:
Katie Ledecky also swam 8:06.68 (2016), 8:07.27 (2018), 8:07.39 (2015), 8:08.04 (2022), 8:09.13 (2018), 8:09.27 (2022), 8:10.32 (2016), 8:10.70 (2019), 8:10.91 (2016), 8:11.00 (2014), 8:11.08 (2018), 8:11.21 (2015), 8:11.35 (2014), 8:11.50 (2017), 8:11.70 (2018), 8:11.83 (2022), 8:11.98 (2018), 8:12.03 (2022), 8:12.57 (2021), 8:12.68 (2017), 8:12.81 (2021), 8:12.86 (2016), 8:13.02 (2015), 8:13.06 (2022), 8:13.20 (2016), 8:13.25 (2015), 8:13.58 (2019), 8:13.64 (2021), 8:13.86 (2013), 8:13.90 (2022), 8:14.24 (2019), 8:14.40 (2018), 8:14.48 (2021), 8:14.59 (2019), 8:14.62 (2021), 8:14.63 (2012), 8:14.70 (2023), 8:14.95 (2019), 8:15.29 (2015), 8:15.44 (2017), 8:15.67 (2021), 8:15.71 (2017), 8:15.97 (2017), 8:16.18 (2014), 8:16.23 (2020),  8:16.39 (2021), 8:16.40 (2015), 8:16.61 (2021), 8:16.90 (2014), 8:17.20 (2021), 8:17.29 (2023), 8:17.33 (2013), 8:17.42 (2019), 8:17.51 (2022), 8:17.92 (2021), 8:18.47 (2014), 8:19.16 (2015), 8:19.18 (2019), 8:19.37 (2022), 8:19.41 (2018), 8:19.42 (2015).
Ariarne Titmus also swam 8:13.83 (2021), 8:15.57 (2021), 8:15.70 (2019), 8:17.07 (2018), 8:18.23 (2019), 8:18.59 (2022), 8:18.61 (2019), 8:18.99 (2021), 8:19.33 (2023), 8:19.43 (2019).
Lotte Friis also swam 8:16.32 (2013), 8:17.16 (2013), 8:18.20 (2011).
Simona Quadarella also swam 8:16.45 (2018), 8:17.32 (2021), 8:17.95 (2019), 8:18.35 (2021), 8:19.00 (2022).
Rebecca Adlington also swam 8:16.81 (2009), 8:17.51 (2011), 8:17.90 (2009), 8:18.06 (2008), 8:18.54 (2012), 8:19.03 (2012).
Leah Smith also swam 8:17.10 (2019), 8:17.21 (2018), 8:17.22 (2017), 8:17.23 (2019), 8:17.52 (2022).
Janet Evans also swam 8:17.12 (1988).
Sarah Köhler also swam 8:17.33 (2021).
Li Bingjie also swam 8:17.39 (2021).
Joanne Jackson also swam 8:17.81 (2009).
Wang Jianjiahe also swam 8:18.09 (2018), 8:18.55 (2018), 8:18.57 (2019), 8:19.10 (2021).
Jazmin Carlin also swam 8:16.17 (2016), 8:18.11 (2014), 8:18.15 (2015), 8:18.36 (2014), 8:18.58 (2013).
Jessica Ashwood also swam 8:18.41 (2015), 8:18.42 (2016).
Lauren Boyle also swam 8:18.58 (2013), 8:18.87 (2014).
Mireia Belmonte also swam 8:18.76 (2012).
Kiah Melverton also swam 8:18.77 (2022), 8:19.05 (2021).
Lani Pallister also swam 8:19.16 (2022).
Laure Manaudou also swam 8:19.29 (2006).
Katie Grimes also swam 8:19.38 (2021).
Boglárka Kapás also swam 8:19.43 (2016).

Women short course
Correct as of December 2022

Notes
Below is a list of other times equal or superior to 8:11.25:
Katie Ledecky also swam 8:00.58† (2022). 
Mireia Belmonte also swam 8:01.43 (2013), 8:03.41 (2014), 8:04.88 (2014), 8:05.18 (2013), 8:07.10 (2017), 8:07.47 (2017), 8:07.59 (2013), 8:07.90 (2013), 8:08.40 (2013), 8:08.57 (2014), 8:10.61 (2014), 8:10.88 (2014), 8:11.19 (2013).
Lauren Boyle also swam 8:02.53 (2013), 8:06.15 (2013), 8:08.62 (2012), 8:10.47 (2013), 8:10.80 (2013).
Li Bingjie also swam 8:02.90 (2021), 8:09.81 (2018), 8:10.08 (2021).
Wang Jianjiahe also swam 8:03.86 (2018), 8:04.35 (2018), 8:07.59 (2018).
Lotte Friis also swam 8:04.77 (2011), 8:07.53 (2011), 8:07.94 (2009), 8:08.02 (2009), 8:08.68 (2013), 8:09.84 (2013), 8:09.91 (2008), 8:10.24 (2012), 8:10.40 (2013), 8:10.99 (2012).
Anastasiya Kirpichnikova also swam 8:06.44 (2021), 8:08.44 (2021), 8:10.62 (2019).
Lani Pallister also swam 8:07.37 (2022), 8:10.12 (2020), 8:10.50 (2020).
Simona Quadarella also swam 8:08.03 (2018), 8:10.30 (2019), 8:10.54 (2021).
Sarah Köhler also swam 8:08.39 (2019), 8:10.54 (2018), 8:10.65 (2017).
Leah Smith also swam 8:08.75 (2018), 8:10.03 (2015), 8:10.17 (2016).
Kristel Kobrich also swam 8:09.25 (2009).
Katinka Hosszú also swam 8:09.27 (2014), 8:09.36 (2014).
Kate Ziegler also swam 8:09.68 (2007).
Isabel Marie Gose also swam 8:10.60 (2021).
Jazmin Carlin also swam 8:11.01 (2015).

References

  Zwemkroniek
  Agenda Diana

Freestyle 0800 metres
World record progression 0800 metres freestyle